The Map Overlay and Statistical System (MOSS), is a GIS software technology. Development of MOSS began in late 1977 and was first deployed for use in 1979. MOSS represents a very early public domain, open source GIS development - predating the better known GRASS by 5 years. MOSS utilized a polygon based data structure in which point, line, and polygon features could all be stored in the same file. The user interacted with MOSS via a command line interface.

History

In the middle 1970s, coal-mining activities required Federal agencies to evaluate the impacts of strip mine development on wildlife and wildlife habitat. They were further tasked with evaluating and making recommendations regarding habitat mitigation.

In 1976, the US Fish and Wildlife Service (FWS) issued a Request For Proposals (RFP) for developing a Geographic Information System [GIS] for environment impact and habitat mitigation studies. The scope of the project included completing a User Needs assessment, developing a GIS functional scope, evaluating existing GIS technologies, and making recommendations to the USFWS as to the appropriate course of action for the development and deployment of GIS technology. In late 1976, the contract was awarded to the Federation of Rocky Mountain States, a not for profit organization that eventually evolved into the Western Governors’ Policy Office.

For the first six months of 1977, the project team worked on two tasks: A User Needs Assessment and an Inventory of Existing GIS technology. The needs assessment involved interviewing wildlife biologists, natural resources planners, and other professionals that would be involved in wildlife habitat definition and habitat mitigation. The results of the assessment were published in the summer of 1977.

Concurrently, Carl Reed did an inventory of existing public domain and commercial GIS technology. Approximately 70 different mapping and GIS software packages were identified. Of these, 54 had enough documentation and basic required functionality to warrant further analysis in terms of matching GIS functionality against user requirements.  This document is a valuable historical document as it has information and details of systems long extinct and forgotten. The evaluation resulted in the determination that no existing GIS capability provided even a fraction of the functional capability required to meet user needs. Therefore, the decision was made to design and program a new interactive GIS application that used existing publicly available software whenever possible.

Using the user requirements as the design driver, the design of MOSS began during the summer of 1977. Once the group agreed on the design, programming started. The development environment was a CDC mainframe running the Kronos operating system. Fortran IV was the development language. Graphics presentation and code development was done on a Tektronix 4010. Initial programming was completed in 1978

In 1978, MOSS was used in a Pilot Project in 1978 totest the validity of using the new MOSS software in a real world FWS habitat mitigation project. The pilot project used vector and raster map data digitized from USGS base maps, from aerial imagery, and maps provided by other agencies. The Pilot project was successful and allowed additional enhancements and bug fixes to be accomplished for deploying MOSS for production use.

By 1979, a user accessible version of MOSS was available on the CDC mainframe. In late 1979, the FWS purchased a Data General computer (AOS Operating System) and required MOSS to be ported from the CDC mainframe to the DG minicomputer. This work was completed in the summer of 1980.

By the middle of 1980, the MOSS software suite was ready for production use. Once installed, operational, and properly documented at the WELUT facility in Fort Collins Colorado, an extensive technology transfer and training activity began. Within a few years, numerous other Federal agencies were using MOSS for a variety of projects. By 1983, MOSS was being used in the Bureau of Indian Affairs, multiple Bureau of Land Management State Offices, the Bureau of Reclamation, National Park Service, US Army Engineering Topographic Labs, Fish and Wildlife Service, and numerous State, Local and University organizations. The first MOSS Users Workshop was held in 1983 and had about 30 attendees. The second users workshop was held in Denver in 1984 with almost 150 attendees.

Architecture
MOSS allowed the user to store both vector and raster in the same geospatial database. The vector data could be points, lines, or polygons. MOSS utilized what at the time was referred to as a "full polygon" representation. In a full polygon representation, each polygon vertex shared with another polygon. Polygons could have islands (holes). Raster data were stored as pixels. The early versions of MOSS only allowed up to 32,000 coordinate pairs per line or polygon feature. This was due to Fortran array addressing issues. Raster images could be no larger than 32,000 pixels per row. Each map in a MOSS database could have up to 32,000 features. There was no limit on the number of maps in the database. Each map had a map header that contained a variety of metadata, such as the coordinate reference system (projection), date of creation, owner, data of last update, description, and so forth. Metadata was "searchable".

References
 Comparison of Selected Operational Capabilities of 54 Geographic Information Systems. FRMS, 1977 (Gropper, Hamill, Reed, Salmen). Under contract Number 14160082155.
 Evaluation and Selection of Existing GIS Software for The U.S. FISH AND WILDLIFE GIS. Carl Reed, AutoCarto 3, 1978.
 Logical Capabilities of the (USFWS) GIS. FRMS, 1978. (Reed, Hammill, Gropper, Salmen). Not available online. Available from the lead author.
 U.S. Fish & Wildlife Service. 1976. WELUT Western Energy and Land Use Team. Fort Collins, CO: Brochure
 Second Annual MOSS Users Workshop. 1985. Denver Colorado. Proceedings prepared by DOI BLM. Not available online. Available from the BLM.
 User Needs Assessment for an Operational GIS within the US Fish and Wildlife. FRMS,1977. (Gropper, Hamill, Nez, Reed, Salmen) Under contract Number 14160082155.

External links
 Map Overlay and Statistical System online resources from the MOSS Heritage team
 MOSS Code repository (Open Access) Zenodo, 2021 Reed, Carl N III, Katz, Sol, Frosh, Randy, Davidson, John, Hunter, Anne, & Lee, John. (2021).
 Open Source GIS history from the OSGeo Foundation

GIS software